Atif Afzal (also known by his stage name A-Zal) is a New York based singer-songwriter and composer. He is known for his music compositions for American television series Ms. Marvel (TV series), Loki (TV series), NCIS: Los Angeles and The Twilight Zone and for the films Resort to Love, Prague, Pune 52, Monsoon Shootout and Baji.

Early life

Afzal grew up in Hounslow, London and attended the Hounslow Heath School. He trained under an alumnus from the conservatoire Royal College of Music, London. He studied engineering from K.J. Somaiya College and then worked at KPMG before starting a career in music.

Career
Afzal began his career in 2013 by composing the film score and soundtracks of Prague, Pune 52 and Baji. He has also worked on international films including a German film, Gift, a European film, Then a Hero Comes Along, a New York short film, The Alternative and Bachelor Girls. In 2017, he scored the background music for Monsoon Shootout, which was produced by Anurag Kashyap and DAR Motion Pictures. He also composed music for the Marathi film Charandas Chor.

Afzal's film albums have released on major record labels including Universal Music Group, Times Music, Zee Music Company and Saregama. He has also sung the songs 'Shravan Shravan' in the film Baji and 'Chor Chor Saare' in the film Charandas Chor.

Afzal moved to New York in 2018 and studied music at the New York University. In 2020, he composed soundtracks for American television series NCIS: Los Angeles and The Twilight Zone.

In 2021, A-Zal composed soundtracks for Loki (TV series) and Alicia Keys produced Netflix film, Resort to Love.

In 2022, A-Zal composed two soundtracks for Marvel Cinematic Studios' Ms. Marvel (TV series).

Filmography

Films 

 Prague (2013)
 Pune 52 (2013)
 Horn Please (2013)
 Baji (2015)
 That Sunday (2015)
 Bachelor Girls (2016)
 Monsoon Shootout (2017)
 Charandas Chor (2017)
 Gift (2017)
 The Alternative (2018)
 Then a Hero Comes Along
 Resort to Love (2021)

Television series 
 NCIS: Los Angeles
 The Twilight Zone 
 Loki (TV series)
 Ms. Marvel (TV series)

References

External links
 
 

Indian male film score composers
Indian film score composers
Year of birth missing (living people)
Living people
21st-century Indian composers
21st-century male musicians